QCC may refer to:
Qassim Cement Company
QCC Information Security
Queanbeyan City Council
Queen's Commonwealth Canopy
Queensborough Community College
Queensland Children's Choir
Queensland Coach Company
Queensland Conservation Council
Queensland Cricketers' Club
Queer Cultural Center
Quinsigamond Community College
Qualified Contingent Cross Orders
Qwest Communications Corporation
Quality Control Circle
a pathotype of Puccinia graminis affecting barley